TX1 Radio is an Independent Local Radio station broadcasting to the Doncaster and Bassetlaw districts of South Yorkshire and Nottinghamshire, England. It launched on September 14, 2020 following the re-branding of Trax FM and other stations as Greatest Hits Radio.

Transmission
The station can be received online via webcast. 

From June 10, 2021 until November 2022, the station was also broadcast on the Lincolnshire DAB radio multiplex, ensuring fortuitous coverage into distant towns such as Boston, Grantham and Scarborough, and even parts of Cambridgeshire and Leicestershire. Despite this, reception may be poor in western parts of the broadcast area such as Conisbrough and Mexborough. Digital radio transmitters are located at Belmont near Market Rasen, Lincoln, Grantham Barracks and High Hunsley near Beverley. 

The station has expressed demand or support in the forthcoming small-scale DAB multiplex for Doncaster in the sole application for the licence.

Schedule
Weekdays:
 Bruce Edwards (7am-10am)
 Mike Nicholson (10am-2pm)
 Darren Spence (2pm-4pm)
 Stewart Nicholson (4pm-7pm)
 John McDonald (7pm-10pm)

Saturdays:
 Leighton Morris (7am-10am)
 Wes Stakes (10am-2pm)
 Chris Marsden (2pm-5pm)
 Chris Birks (5pm-9pm)
 Stewart Nicholson (9pm-11pm)

Sundays:
 Leighton Morris (7am-10am)
 Bruce Edwards (10am-2pm)
 Stu White (2pm-5pm)
 Jemma Hall (5pm-7pm)
 The Album Show with Bruce Edwards (7pm-8pm)
 Clare Elise (8pm-10pm)

References

Radio stations in Yorkshire
Radio stations in Nottinghamshire
Radio stations established in 2021
Mass media in Doncaster
Bassetlaw District
Digital-only radio stations